Gaston School District 11J is a public school district in Washington County, Oregon, United States serving the city of Gaston. The district was established about 1852 and later the Wappato (511J) and Yamhill (555J) districts in neighboring Yamhill County merged into the district. It is a two-school district, consisting of Gaston Elementary School and Gaston Junior/Senior High School. Both the schools and the district offices share a single campus in the center of Gaston, bordered on the north side by Park Street and on the East side by 3rd Street. 

The elementary school mascot is the Pups.

Demographics
In the 2009 school year, the district had 13 students classified as homeless by the Department of Education, or 2.7% of students in the district.

References

External links
Gaston Public Schools (official website)

School districts in Oregon
Education in Washington County, Oregon
Education in Yamhill County, Oregon
1852 establishments in Oregon Territory
School districts established in 1852